N-acetylneuraminylgalactosylglucosylceramide beta-1,4-N-acetylgalactosaminyltransferase (is an enzyme that catalyses the following chemical reaction:

 UDP-N-acetyl-D-galactosamine + N-acetylneuraminyl-(2->3)-alpha-D-galactosyl-(1->4)-beta-D-glucosyl-(1<->1)-ceramide  UDP + N-acetyl-D-galactosaminyl-(1->4)-beta-N-acetylneuraminyl-(2->3)-alpha-D-galactosyl-(1->4)-beta-D-glucosyl-(1<->1)-ceramide

This enzyme requires Mn2+.

Nomenclature 
This enzyme is also known as uridine diphosphoacetylgalactosamine-acetylneuraminyl(alpha2->3)galactosyl(beta1->4)glucosyl beta1->4-acetylgalactosaminyltransferase, UDP-N-acetyl-D-galactosamine:N-acetylneuraminyl-2,3-alpha-D-galactosyl-1,4-beta-D-glucosylceramide beta-1,4-N-acetylgalactosaminyltransferase) with systematic name UDP-N-acetyl-D-galactosamine:N-acetylneuraminyl-(2->3)-alpha-D-galactosyl-(1->4)-beta-D-glucosyl-(1<->1)-ceramide 4-beta-N-acetylgalactosaminyltransferase.

References

External links 
 

EC 2.4.1